Phil Chandler (born 6 July 1972) is a New Zealand cricketer. He played in 31 first-class and 47 List A matches for Wellington from 1994 to 2002.

See also
 List of Wellington representative cricketers

References

External links
 

1972 births
Living people
New Zealand cricketers
Wellington cricketers
Cricketers from Wellington City